Apple stem grooving virus is a plant pathogenic virus of the family Betaflexiviridae.

External links
ICTVdB - The Universal Virus Database: Apple stem grooving virus
Family Groups - The Baltimore Method

Betaflexiviridae
Viral plant pathogens and diseases